L. A. Park Jr. (born June 1, 2000) is the ring name of a Mexican Luchador enmascarado. He currently works for Major League Wrestling as well as the independent circuit. His real name is not a matter of public record, as is often the case with masked wrestlers in Mexico, where their private lives are kept a secret from the wrestling fans. L.A. Park Jr. is the younger son of L.A. Park and the younger brother of El Hijo de L.A. Park.

Professional wrestling career

Championships and accomplishments
Kaoz Lucha Libre
Kaoz Trios Championship (1 time)  with El Hijo de L.A. Park and La Bestia del Ring

References

External links
MLW profile
 

2000 births
Living people
Masked wrestlers
Mexican male professional wrestlers
Professional wrestlers from Nuevo León
People from Monterrey